The 2001 Philippine Basketball Association (PBA) rookie draft was an event at which teams drafted players from the amateur ranks. It was held on January 14, 2001, at the Glorietta Activity Center at Makati.

Round 1

Round 2

Round 3

Round 4

Round 5

Round 6

Note
*All players are Filipinos until proven otherwise.

References

Philippine Basketball Association draft
draft